Sinnar University was established in Sinnar, Sudan in 1977.
It is a member of the Federation of the Universities of the Islamic World.
As of September 2011, the university was a member in good standing of the Association of African Universities.

References

Universities and colleges in Sudan
Educational institutions established in 1977
1977 establishments in Sudan